Ahmad Ali Sakr (born 7 April 1970) is a Lebanese former footballer who played as a goalkeeper.

Club career 
Sakr joined Nejmeh on 1 October 2005.

International career 
Sakr was the Lebanon national team's goalkeeper during the matches against Iran and Iraq at the 2000 AFC Asian Cup held in Lebanon. He played over 30 games for Lebanon between 1993 and 2003.

Honours 
Individual
 Lebanese Premier League Best Save: 1997–98, 1998–99, 2000–01
 Lebanese Premier League Team of the Season: 2005–06

See also
 List of Lebanon international footballers

References

External links
 
 
 
 

1970 births
Living people
People from Beqaa Governorate
Lebanese footballers
Association football goalkeepers
Lebanese Premier League players
Homenmen Beirut players
Tadamon Sour SC players
Olympic Beirut players
Nejmeh SC players
Lebanon international footballers
2000 AFC Asian Cup players
Al Mabarra Club players
Asian Games competitors for Lebanon
Footballers at the 1998 Asian Games